Erra Sainyam is a 1994 Indian Telugu-language action drama film directed by R. Narayana Murthy and starring himself and Narra Venkateswara Rao. The film was screened in the mainstream section of the 26th International Film Festival of India.

Cast 
R. Narayana Murthy as Singanna
Narra Venkateswara Rao
Sanjeevi
Puranam Surya
Spandana
Guda Anjaiah as a judge
 Mukku Raju
Telangana Shakuntala
Udaya Bhanu as Singanna's sister

Soundtrack

Release and reception 
The film was a box office success in Andhra Pradesh and prompted Narayana Murthy to star in Orey Rikshaw (1995). The film inspired many directors to make films in a similar naxalite-based films.

Goodipoodi Srihari has praised Murthy for directing in a political film with a serious subject, and Narayana for his dialogue. Srihari felt that the use of folk songs was the film's strength.

Remake 
The film was remade in Hindi as Yeh Dhartee Hamaree Hai (2007) by Narayana Murthy, who reprised his role.

References 

Telugu films remade in other languages